Newfield is a populated place situated in Pima County, Arizona, along the border between the United States and Mexico.

References

Populated places in Pima County, Arizona